Richell Pacaldo Angalot Asuncion-Mudie (born January 22, 1989) is a Filipino actress who became the First Princess of StarStruck: The Next Level. Asuncion was also First Runner-up of Binibining Pilipinas 2009.

Biography and career
Richell Pacaldo Angalot, the eldest child of Richard Angalot and Melinda Pacaldo of Bool District, Tagbilaran City, Richell was 15 years old when she first joined a beauty pageant representing Tagbilaran City Schools Division in the Miss Central Visayas Regional Athletic Association (CVRAA) 2004 in Danao, Cebu. She won third runner-up, Miss Talent and the Best in Fun Wear trophies. She was one of the sagalas of the Santacruzan 2004 and was chosen muse of Bohol Lions during the Lions District Convention in 2004. Later that year, Asuncion was declared Female Grand Champion in Island City Mall's Campus Discovery Model Quest 2004. In September 2007, Rich Asuncion became a Regal Entertainment contract star. She married Benjamin Mudie in May 2018 in Hong Kong.

Binibining Pilipinas 2009
Asuncion March 7, 2009 at the Araneta Coliseum. She was Candidate No. 3. From the original applicants (numbering over 170), only 36 were asked to return. The final 24 were decided after the contestants underwent gruelling hours of pressure and tension at the Mandarin Suites on the fifth of February.

Filmography

Television

Movies

Awards and nominations

References

External links

Rich Asuncion on iGMA.tv

1989 births
Living people
Binibining Pilipinas winners
Filipino child actresses
Filipino film actresses
Filipino television actresses
GMA Network personalities
Boholano people
Visayan people
People from Tagbilaran
Actresses from Bohol
People from Marikina
StarStruck (Philippine TV series) participants